HNLMS O 12 was a  of the Royal Netherlands Navy. Built at Koninklijke Maatschappij De Schelde in Vlissingen, she was launched in 1930 but was unable to take part in military action during World War II. After being scuttled by the Dutch Navy, she was raised by Nazi Germany's Kriegsmarine and taken into service as UD-2, and then scuttled again.

Service history

Before World War II
Two years later, O 12 sailed with sister ship  to Surinam and Curaçao.

During World War II
During the German attack on the Netherlands in 1940, O 12 was at the naval wharf of Willemsoord, Den Helder for periodic maintenance. Unable to make the trip across the North Sea to England, the ship was scuttled.

The German occupying forces had O 12 raised and sent her to the Wilton-Fijenoord wharf in Rotterdam for repairs. On 30 January 1943, she was taken into service by Nazi Germany's Kriegsmarine, as UD-2. On 6 July 1944, she was taken out of service and moved to Kiel, where she was scuttled in the harbor just before the end of the war. Afterwards, UD-2 was raised and demolished.

References

1930 ships
Ships built in Vlissingen
World War II submarines of the Netherlands
O 12-class submarines
Naval ships of the Netherlands captured by Germany during World War II
Maritime incidents in May 1940
Maritime incidents in May 1945
Submarines built by Koninklijke Maatschappij De Schelde